Amphipsalta cingulata, the clapping cicada, is a species of cicada that is endemic to New Zealand.

Taxonomy
This species was first described in 1775 by Johann Christian Fabricius and named Tettigonia cingulata.

Distribution 
This species is endemic to New Zealand and is found only in the North Island.

References

Cicadas of New Zealand
Endemic fauna of New Zealand
Insects described in 1775
Taxa named by Johan Christian Fabricius
Cicadettini
Endemic insects of New Zealand